FORM may refer to:

 FORM (symbolic manipulation system), a symbolic manipulation system.
 FORM (arts organisation), a Western Australian arts organisation
 First-order reliability method, a method to evaluate the reliability of a civil engineering structure

See also 
 Form (disambiguation)